Crypsotidia digitata is a moth of the family Erebidae. It is found in Ethiopia.

References

Moths described in 2005
Crypsotidia